Tajeli bin Salamat (born February 7, 1994) is a Singaporean professional footballer who is currently playing as a defender for Singapore Premier League club Tanjong Pagar United.

Club career

Lions City Sailors 
During the Sailors' 2022 AFC Champions League campaign in Buriram, Thailand, Tajeli and midfielder Anumanthan Kumar were expelled from the squad and sent back to Singapore for breaking the team's curfew.

International career
Tajeli was called up to the Singapore U22 at age 25 for the 2019 Southeast Asian Games (SEA Games) in Manila as an overaged player. He made his SEA Games debut in a 0-0 draw against Laos under-23. During the SEA Games, Tajeli and eight footballers broke curfew. He, along with the other eight players, was subsequently punished with a fine by the Singapore National Olympic Council.

On 11 November 2021, Tajeli made his international debut for Singapore National Team in an International 'A' Friendly match against Kyrgyzstan.

Career statistics 

 Update 26 May 2022

International

Honours

Club

Lion City Sailors 

 Singapore Premier League
 Champion: 2021

References

External links
 

Living people
1994 births
Singaporean footballers
Warriors FC players
Balestier Khalsa FC players
Young Lions FC players
Home United FC players
Association football defenders
Lion City Sailors FC players